Periodontal ligament stem cells are stem cells found near the periodontal ligament of the teeth.  They are involved in adult regeneration of the periodontal ligament, alveolar bone, and cementum.  The cells are known to express STRO-1 and CD146 proteins.

Tissues (biology)